Gina Andrea Cruz Blackledge (born 8 July 1969) is a Mexican lawyer and politician who is the National Action Party Senator from the State of Baja California.

Early life 
Cruz Blackledge was born in Mexicali.

Education 
She graduated from the Autonomous University of Baja California.

Career 
She sat in the Chamber of Deputies in 2002, and from 2015 to 2018.

She was elected to the Senate in the 2018 general election.

References

External links 

 Cruz Blackledge at the Parliament of Mexico
 Cruz Blackledge on Twitter

1969 births
Living people
Senators of the LXIV and LXV Legislatures of Mexico
National Action Party (Mexico) politicians
21st-century Mexican politicians
21st-century Mexican women politicians
Women members of the Senate of the Republic (Mexico)
Politicians from Baja California
People from Mexicali
Autonomous University of Baja California alumni
Deputies of the LXIII Legislature of Mexico
Members of the Chamber of Deputies (Mexico) for Baja California
Members of the Senate of the Republic (Mexico) for Baja California
Women members of the Chamber of Deputies (Mexico)